Dr. Alexander Thompson Bigelow (born 1841; died 1923) was an American chess master.

Bigelow was the City Champion of Saint Paul, Minnesota in 1901. He played several times in the U.S. Open Chess Championship; tied for 9-10th in Excelsior, Minnesota, in 1901, took 8th at Excelsior 1902, tied for 9-10th at Chicago 1903, took 10th at Excelsior 1905, took 14th at Excelsior 1907, and took 4th at Excelsior 1908 (elim.).

External links

References

1841 births
1923 deaths
American chess players